Surat–Chennai Expressway is an under-construction,  long, four- to six-lane access-controlled expressway, which will connect the second largest city of Gujarat, Surat, with the capital of Tamil Nadu, Chennai, in India. It will pass through six states: Gujarat, Maharashtra, Karnataka, Telangana, Andhra Pradesh and Tamil Nadu. It will be built at a cost of ₹ 45,000 crore (~US$5.5 billion), which was earlier slated at ₹ 50,000 crore. It will be the second longest expressway in India, after the Delhi–Mumbai Expressway.

History
To facilitate socio-economic development, economic growth and trade in India by ensuring faster and better transportation of goods from northern to southern India, the Ministry of Road Transport and Highways (MoRTH) planned to build a highway from Surat to Chennai, in 2021, which will help to improve connectivity, industrial activities and trade by creating a direct link, and develop the regions of Andhra Pradesh, Telangana and central Maharashtra, which at present lack them altogether as compared to other industrial regions in the country. This will also help to transport goods directly from the national capital to South India via the Delhi–Mumbai Expressway and this expressway. The ministry stated that the project will be built at a cost of ₹ 50,000 crore. In January 2023, the project was approved by the Government of India and included it in the Bharatmala Pariyojana's Phase-II. It will be built at a cost of ₹ 45,000 crore (~US$5.5 billion), and the foundation stone for the project was laid by Prime Minister Narendra Modi for the construction of the expressway's Karnataka to Akkalkot section, on the same month. The expressway is expected to be completed by December 2026.

Route
The expressway will start from Surat in Gujarat, pass through six states, districts and their states, and terminate at Chennai, Tamil Nadu.

Gujarat
Surat, Surat district (starting point)
Navsari district
Valsad district

Maharashtra
Nashik, Nashik district
Ahmednagar, Ahmednagar district
Solapur and Akkalkot, Solapur district

Karnataka
Kalaburagi, Kalaburagi district
Yadgir district

Telangana
Mahabubnagar district

Andhra Pradesh
Kurnool, Kurnool district
Kadapa, Kadapa district
Tirupati, Chittoor district

Tamil Nadu
Tiruvallur district
Chennai, Chennai district (terminating point)

Construction
The expressway has been divided into two sections based on the region's topography–Greenfield and Brownfield, as well as economic corridors. The expressway will be built using the Hybrid Annuity Model (HAM) of construction. The two sections are described in the following:

Surat–Solapur Economic Corridor
The Surat–Nashik–Ahmednagar–Solapur Economic Corridor is the first part and the northern section of the expressway, which will be fully greenfield, six-lane and access-controlled. The alignment of this part lies mostly on the existing National Highway 150C. It will pass through two states–Maharashtra and Gujarat start from Surat in Gujarat, as the expressway's starting point, and will cover the cities of Nashik, Ahmednagar and Solapur, until the Maharashtra-Karnataka border. It will be  in length, out of which the Surat–Ahmednagar section will cover  and the Ahmednagar–Solapur–Akkalkot until the Maharashtra-Karnataka border section will cover . This section's Detailed Project Report (DPR) has been completed by the Hyderabad-based joint venture firm, Aarvee Associates–Nag Infrastructure Engineers and Consultant JV. This section will be built at a cost of ₹ 30,000 crore. Currently, this section is under bidding, design preparation and land acquisition. It has been divided into 14 packages, which are described in the following table:

Solapur-Chennai Economic Corridor
The Solapur–Kurnool–Chennai Economic Corridor is the second part and the southern section of the expressway, which will be a mix of greenfield and brownfield sections, six/four-lane and access-controlled. The alignment of this part also lies mostly on the existing National Highway 150C (NH-150C). It will pass through five states–Maharashtra, Karnataka, Telangana, Andhra Pradesh and Tamil Nadu. It will be  in length, out of which the greenfield section from Akkalkot to Mahabubnagar will cover , while the remaining  from Mahabubnagar to Chennai, where it will terminate, will be the brownfield section. This section's Detailed Project Report (DPR) is underway, and will be built at a cost of ₹ 15,000 crore. Due to this, these two sections of the expressway will be completed one year before the scheduled deadline of December 2026, i.e., in December 2025. It has been divided into 6 packages, which are described in the following table:

Maharashtra

Karnataka

Telangana

The bidding process for the remaining stretch until Chennai is underway, as of February 2023.

Benefits
The expressway will benefit the entire country, as follows:
Trade: As the expressway will connect North and South India, it will result in a high increase in transportation of goods and people, thus resulting in growth in exports, reducing dependency on imports, as well as industrial activities and accelerating economic development.
Tourism: It will facilitate tourism by promoting it in western parts of Andhra Pradesh, Karnataka, central Maharashtra and along the Western Ghats, well known for its environment, thus resulting in the development of local economies.
Connectivity: The expressway will create a direct connection between North and South India, resulting in faster, safer and better commute, by avoiding the existing congested routes via Bengaluru, Hyderabad, Pune and Mumbai, as well as reducing travel time and distance considerably, from around 35 hours to around 28 hours, and from approx. 1,570 km to 1,271 km.
Protection of the environment: To ensure the protection of green cover, trees and plants will be planted along and between the route of the expressway.
Employment: Due to increase in industrial activities along the expressway's route, various agricultural and industrial initiatives will help the states' as well as the nation economy and growth. The establishment of these numerous centres will result in multiple job possibilities for thousands of people living in both the states, and will result in immense socio-economic development.

Environmental concerns
In July 2022, in a meeting of the Expert Appraisal Committee (EAC) of the Ministry of Environment, Forests and Climate Change (MoEFCC), the EAC raised concerns on the alignment of the northern part of the expressway from Surat to Ahmednagar, through the Western Ghats region, which is ecologically sensitive, and the project could result in a serious harm to the region's environment due to deforestation and soil erosion, as well as pollution. So, the EAC recommended the Ministry of Road Transport and Highways (MoRTH) to change the expressway's alignment by avoiding the Ghats section. However, the MoRTH and the National Highways Authority of India (NHAI) gave an appeal to the EAC to negotiate the issue and requested to give way to the project, as the design preparation, packages and their bidding process and the Detailed Project Report (DPR) of the entire northern section of the expressway, including the Ghats section, are underway, and if changed the alignment, it may reduce the impact and benefits of the expressway on the places through which it will pass. The NHAI said that the construction procedure will be using modern and sustainable methods in that section to minimize any environmental damage, as much as possible.

Status updates
March 2021: The plan of the expressway was announced by the Ministry of Road Transport and Highways to the Government of India.
February 2022: 14 bidders participated for the Package 2 section of Telangana.
January 2023: The foundation stone for the expressway was laid by Prime Minister, Narendra Modi, and construction started on the Akkalkot–Yadgir section of the project, in the state of Karnataka. This section, divided into two sub-sections, will be completed one year before the deadline of December 2026, i.e., in December 2025.

See also
Expressways of India

Notes

References

External links
 The definition and importance of Sustainable Construction

Highways in India
Roads in India